Mamadou Diarra (born 20 December 1997) is a Senegalese professional footballer who plays as a centre-back for French  club Grenoble.

Club career
A youth product of the Senegalese club ASC Jaraaf, Diarra began his senior career with the Turkish club Boluspor. After a stint with Bursaspor, he transferred to Giresunspor in on 30 August 2020. He made his professional debut with Giresunspor in a 1–0 Süper Lig loss to Alanyaspor on 13 September 2021.

On 1 September 2022, Diarra signed a three-year contract with Grenoble in French Ligue 2.

International career
Diarra is a youth international for Senegal, having captained the Senegal U20s in 2017.

References

External links
 

1997 births
Footballers from Dakar
Living people
Senegalese footballers
Senegal youth international footballers
Association football defenders
Boluspor footballers
Bursaspor footballers
Giresunspor footballers
Grenoble Foot 38 players
TFF First League players
TFF Second League players
Süper Lig players
Ligue 2 players
Senegalese expatriate footballers
Senegalese expatriate sportspeople in Turkey
Expatriate footballers in Turkey
Senegalese expatriate sportspeople in France
Expatriate footballers in France